Gordon's Olympia Theatre (est. 1910s) in Boston, Massachusetts, was established by Nathan H. Gordon of Olympia Theatres, Inc. Architect Clarence Blackall designed the building at no.658 Washington Street, near Boylston Street in the theatre district. It later became the Pilgrim Theater. The building was demolished in 1996.

In late 1974, the Pilgrim Theater was the site of a drunken rant and press conference by House Ways and Means Committee chairman Wilbur Mills at the height of his sex scandal with Fanne Foxe, which prompted his resignation from the committee shortly afterwards.

Images

See also
 Combat Zone, Boston

References

External links

 Library of Congress. Drawing of Gordon's Olympia Theatre, Washington St. near Boylston St., 1921.
 Bostonian Society. Photo of 634-658 1/2 Washington Street, ca. 1958, showing Pilgrim Theater
 King, Loren (2013). "Pilgrim", Caboose.
 "Escalators for Theaters" (1913), American Architect.
 A Few Tales from the Pilgrim by Don L. Stradley, 2014.

1910s establishments in Massachusetts
20th century in Boston
Boston Theater District
Cultural history of Boston
Former buildings and structures in Boston
Former theatres in Boston
1996 disestablishments in Massachusetts
Demolished buildings and structures in Boston
Buildings and structures demolished in 1996